Bryan James Harper (born December 29, 1989) is an American former professional baseball pitcher. Harper spent eight seasons in the Washington Nationals organization. He is the older brother of Phillies outfielder Bryce Harper.

Early life
Growing up in Las Vegas, Nevada, Harper played a number of sports, including basketball and American football as well as baseball. Bryce Harper has said that the reason he bats left-handed is because he always wanted to be like his older brother, who throws left-handed. The younger Harper said he tried throwing left-handed when he was young, but being naturally right-handed, he was "terrible" at it, so he settled for hitting from the left side instead.

Baseball career

High school and college
Harper attended Las Vegas High School, pitching for the school's baseball team. He was drafted in the 2008 Major League Baseball draft in the 31st round by the Washington Nationals, but he chose not to sign.

After graduating from high school, Harper briefly relocated out-of-state to pitch at California State University, Northridge, for the Cal State Northridge Matadors before transferring back to Las Vegas to attend the College of Southern Nevada. The Harper brothers were teammates on the Las Vegas High baseball team as well as at Southern Nevada, a junior college that Bryce Harper attended early so that he could sign with a major league team as quickly as possible. At the time, Bryce was a catcher, so the Harper brothers would often form the Coyotes' battery. On the Coyotes baseball team, they were managed by Tim Chambers, who later praised Bryan Harper's work ethic and professionalism in spite of being overshadowed by his younger brother. Harper acknowledged in a 2015 interview that he has "never been the uber-prospect like my brother has", but he said he focused on his pitching and was consistently able to get batters out.

Bryan Harper pitched in the 2010 JUCO World Series, with Bryce Harper as his catcher, earning the win in an 18-1 blowout of Faulkner State Community College in the second round of the tournament. After Bryce was ejected and suspended later in the tournament, Bryan Harper got to pitch in an elimination game versus Iowa Western Community College. While the Coyotes led into the ninth inning, the team's closer gave up a walk-off home run, ending their playoff run.

The Harper brothers spent just one year together at Southern Nevada before Bryce was drafted in the 2010 Major League Baseball draft. Although Chambers hoped Bryan Harper would be picked up by the Nationals again in a later round of the draft, believing he could help his younger brother make the transition to professional baseball, he was ultimately selected in the 27th round by the Chicago Cubs.

While Bryce Harper, having been taken by the Nationals with the first overall draft pick, chose to sign and become a member of the Nationals organization, Bryan Harper declined to sign with the Cubs. He instead went to the University of South Carolina, where he pitched in relief for the Gamecocks as a setup man. He won the 2011 College World Series with South Carolina. During that 2011 season with South Carolina, he recorded a 5.40 ERA over 18 1/3 innings. He later admitted he "didn't pitch the best" as a Gamecock, but he said the additional year of college helped with his maturity.

Washington Nationals
Harper was originally drafted by the Nationals in the 31st round of the 2008 Major League Baseball draft out of Las Vegas High School, but he chose not to sign. He was then drafted in the 27th round of the 2010 MLB draft—in which his younger brother Bryce was selected first overall by the Nationals—by the Chicago Cubs out of the College of Southern Nevada but again did not sign. After Harper transferred to the University of South Carolina, he was drafted again by the Nationals in the 2011 MLB draft in the 30th round. Feeling he was ready at that point to play professionally, he agreed to terms, joining his brother in the organization.

While Bryce Harper, who was quickly converted from catching to playing in the outfield, shot through the Nationals organization—he made his major league debut in April 2012—Bryan Harper's progression was slower. He spent the 2012 season with the Low-A Auburn Doubledays and the 2013 season with the Class-A Hagerstown Suns, working exclusively out of the bullpen. Starting in the 2014 season, he began to advance into the high minor leagues, ending the year with the Class-AA Harrisburg Senators and appearing briefly in the 2015 season with the Class-AAA Syracuse Chiefs, a step away from the major leagues. After spending the first two months of the 2016 season back with the Senators and recording a 1.50 ERA over 24 innings pitched, including 16 out of 20 scoreless appearances, Harper was promoted again to the Chiefs in June.

After pitching to a 2.95 ERA over 21 1/3 innings with the Chiefs in 2016, Harper was shut down in August with a forearm strain. He was ruled out for the season, ending any chance of being called up to the Nationals that year, and in November, he underwent Tommy John surgery, an operation expected to rule him out for the 2017 season as well. As a result of the surgery, he was not added to the 40-man roster after the 2016 season as had been previously expected, according to The Washington Post.

Harper re-signed with the Nationals after the 2017 season and was invited to major league spring training in 2018 for the first time, vying for a spot in the Washington bullpen. He spent the 2018 regular season with Harrisburg, making 44 relief appearances. He became a free agent following the season.

Lancaster Barnstormers
On March 22, 2019, Harper signed with the Lancaster Barnstormers of the independent Atlantic League of Professional Baseball. He became a free agent following the season.

Pitching style
At 6-foot-5, Bryan Harper stands two inches taller than Bryce Harper. Unlike Bryce, he throws left-handed. While his fastball velocity sat in the mid-80s when he was pitching for the University of South Carolina in 2011, he was throwing in the low 90s with the Syracuse Chiefs in 2016 prior to undergoing Tommy John surgery. His pitching arsenal includes a fastball, curveball, slider, and changeup.

References

External links

1989 births
Living people
Sportspeople from Las Vegas
Baseball players from Nevada
Baseball pitchers
Cal State Northridge Matadors baseball players
Southern Nevada Coyotes baseball players
South Carolina Gamecocks baseball players
Gulf Coast Nationals players
Auburn Doubledays players
Hagerstown Suns players
Potomac Nationals players
Harrisburg Senators players
Syracuse Chiefs players
Minor league baseball players
Lancaster Barnstormers players